Aditya II (born Aditha Karikalan 942 CE - 971 CE), also known as  Aditya Chola, was a Chola prince who lived in the 10th century in India. He was born in Tirukoilur and was the eldest son of Parantaka Chola II. He was the elder brother of Rajaraja Chola I and Kundavai. He was called as Virapandiyan Thalai Konda Koparakesari Varman Karikalan.

He led the Chola expedition against the Pandyas and defeated the Pandya king Veerapandyan at the Battle of Chevur. He killed Veerapandiyan after chasing him on the banks of Vaigai river. Aditya was made the co-regent and heir apparent to the Chola throne even though Uttama Chola, the son of Gandaradita Chola, had more right to the throne. He was assassinated by the associates of Veerapandiyan in revenge for the defeat. Aditya was succeeded by Uttama Chola. As per epigraphs, the inquiry into the death was completed in the second year of Rajaraja Chola I's reign and the lands of certain officials were confiscated for their complicity in the murder of "Karikala Chola who took the head of the Pandya".

According to archaeologist Kudavayil Balasubramanian, "Dr K T Tirunavukkarasu in his collection of historical essays titled "Arunmozhi Aiyvu Thogudi", comprehensively ruled out Madurantaka Uttama's role in Aaditha Karikala's murder. In the said article, basing his view on a number of historical data points, Dr Tirunavukkarasu has gone on to explain that there was a delay in apprehending the perpetrators immediately thereafter and it was only during Rajaraja I's second regnal year that the culprits were brought to book
. Suspicions were pointed to Uttama Chola but confiscations of land belonging to culprits started before Raja Raja's period suggesting that Uttama Chola did not spare the plotters. Among the punished were Ravidasan, Soman and Parameshwaran who were all government officials. They avenged for the decapitation of Veerapandyan by Aaditha Karikalan.

References

Chola dynasty
10th-century Indian monarchs
942 births
969 deaths
Murdered Indian royalty